Ali Rial (born March 26, 1980) is an Algerian football player who is currently playing as a defender for JS Kabylie in the Algerian Ligue Professionnelle 1.

International career
In December 2012, Rial was included by Algeria coach Vahid Halilhodžić in an initial list of 40 players for the 2013 Africa Cup of Nations in South Africa. A week later, Halilhodžić narrowed the list down to 24 players, with Rial's name still on the list.

On January 17, 2013, Rial made his unofficial debut for Algeria as a starter in a friendly match against South African club Platinum Stars, which Algeria won 4-1.

Honours
 Won the Algerian Cup once with JS Kabylie in 2010–11 Algerian Cup

References

External links
 
 

1980 births
Living people
Algerian footballers
People from Zemmouri
People from Bordj Menaïel District
People from Boumerdès Province
Kabyle people
USM Alger players
JS Kabylie players
Algerian Ligue Professionnelle 1 players
Algeria A' international footballers
2013 Africa Cup of Nations players
NARB Réghaïa players
Association football defenders
21st-century Algerian people